The Vaimānika Śāstra (lit. "shastra on the topic of Vimanas"; or "science of aeronautics", sometimes also rendered Vimanika, Vymanika, Vyamanika) is an early 20th-century text in Sanskrit.  It makes the claim that the vimānas mentioned in ancient Sanskrit epics were advanced aerodynamic flying vehicles.

The existence of the text was revealed in 1952 by G. R. Josyer who asserted that it was written by Pandit Subbaraya Shastry (1866–1940), who dictated it during the years 1918–1923. A Hindi translation was published in 1959, while the Sanskrit text with an English translation was published in 1973. It contains 3000 shlokas in 8 chapters which Shastry claimed was psychically delivered to him by the ancient Hindu sage Bharadvaja.  The text has gained favour among proponents of ancient astronauts.

A study by aeronautical and mechanical engineering researchers at the Indian Institute of Science, Bangalore, in 1974 concluded that the aircraft described in the text were "poor concoctions" and that the author showed a complete lack of understanding of aeronautics. Regarding the "Rukma Vimana", the study noted, "If the craft is taken to mean what the drawing and the text say, it can be stated that the craft is a decided impossibility".

Origin and publication
The existence of the text was revealed in 1952 by G. R. Josyer who asserted that it was written by Pandit Subbaraya Shastry (1866–1940), who dictated it during the years 1918–1923. A Hindi translation was published in 1959, while the Sanskrit text with an English translation was published in 1973. It contains 3000 shlokas in 8 chapters which Shastry claimed was psychically delivered to him by the ancient Hindu sage Bharadvaja.  The text has gained favour among proponents of ancient astronauts. The Vaimānika Śāstra manuscript appeared at Rajakiya Sanskrit Library, Baroda by 1944.
The text was published in Hindi in 1959 and later in English by G.R. Josyer, titled Vymanika Shastra. Josyer's edition also added illustrations drawn by T. K. Ellappa, a draughtsman at a local engineering college in Bangalore, under the direction of Shastry, which had been missed in the 1959 edition.

Its existence was first announced publicly in a 1952 press release by G.R. Josyer, who had founded his "International Academy of Sanskrit Research" in Mysore the year before. In the foreword to the 1973 publication that contained the full Sanskrit text with English translation, Josyer quotes a 1952 press release of his which was "published in all the leading dailies of India, and was taken up by Reuter and other World Press News Services":
Mr. G. R. Josyer, Director of the International Academy of Sanskrit Research in Mysore, in the course of an interview recently, showed some very ancient manuscripts which the Academy had collected. He claimed that the manuscripts were several thousands of years old, compiled by ancient rishis, Bharadwaja, Narada and others, dealing, not with the mysticism of ancient Hindu philosophy of Atman or Brahman, but with more mundane things vital for the existence of man and progress of nations both in times of peace and war.
[...] One manuscript dealt with Aeronautics, construction of various types of aircraft for civil aviation and for warfare. [...] Mr. Josyer showed some types of designs and drawing of a helicopter-type cargo-loading plane, specially meant for carrying combustibles and ammunition, passenger aircraft carrying 400 to 500 persons, double and treble-decked aircraft. Each of these types had been fully described.

Josyer then tells how he was visited by "Miss Jean Lyon, journalist of Toronto and New York" for an interview, and how Lyon in her Just Half a World Away (1954) concluded that he was "guilty of a rabid nationalism, seeking to wipe out everything since the Vedas".

A critical review pronounced Josyer's introduction to be "least scholarly by any standards" and said that "the people connected with publication – directly or indirectly – are solely to blame either for distorting or hiding the history of the manuscripts", perhaps in an attempt to "eulogise and glorify whatever they can find about our past, even without valid evidence". By tracing the provenance of the manuscript, interviewing associates of Shastry (including G. V. Sharma to whom the text was originally dictated), and based on the linguistic analysis of the text, the review concluded that it came into existence sometime between 1900 and 1922.

Structure and content

Unlike modern treatises on aeronautics that begin by discussing the general principles of flight before detailing concepts of aircraft design, the Vaimānika Shāstra starts with a quantitative description, as though a particular aircraft is being described. The topics covered include, "definition of an airplane, a pilot, aerial routes, food, clothing, metals, metal production, mirrors and their uses in wars, varieties of machinery and yantras, planes like ‘mantrik’, ‘tantrik’, and ‘kritak’" and four planes called Shakuna, Sundara, Rukma, and Tripura are described in greater detail. The extant text is claimed to be only a small (one-fortieth) part of a larger work Yantra Sarvaswa ("All about machines") composed by Maharishi Bharadwaj and other sages for the "benefit of all mankind".

Appraisal
J. B. Hare of the Internet Sacred Text Archive in 2005 compiled an online edition of Josyer's 1973 book, in the site's "UFOs" section. In his introduction, Hare writes
The Vaimānika Śāstra was first committed to writing between 1918 and 1923, and nobody is claiming that it came from some mysterious antique manuscript. The fact is, there are no manuscripts of this text before 1918, and nobody is claiming that there are. So on one level, this is not a hoax. You just have to buy into the assumption that 'channeling' works.
...
there is no exposition of the theory of aviation (let alone antigravity). In plain terms, the VS. never directly explains how Vimanas get up in the air. The text is top-heavy with long lists of often bizarre ingredients used to construct various subsystems. 
...
There is nothing here which Jules Verne couldn't have dreamed up, no mention of exotic elements or advanced construction techniques. The 1923 technical illustration based on the text ... are absurdly un-aerodynamic. They look like brutalist wedding cakes, with minarets, huge ornithopter wings and dinky propellers. In other words, they look like typical early 20th century fantasy flying machines with an Indian twist.

A 1974 study by researchers at the Indian Institute of Science, Bangalore, found that the heavier-than-air aircraft that the Vaimānika Śāstra described were aeronautically unfeasible. The authors remarked that the discussion of the principles of flight in the text were largely perfunctory and incorrect, in some cases violating Newton's laws of motion. The study concluded:
Any reader by now would have concluded the obvious – that the planes described above are the best poor concoctions, rather than expressions of something real. None of the planes has properties or capabilities of being flown; the geometries are unimaginably horrendous from the point of view of flying; and the principles of propulsion make them resist rather than assist flying. The text and the drawings do not correlate with each other even thematically. The drawings definitely point to a knowledge of modern machinery. This can be explained on the basis of the fact that Shri Ellappa who made the drawings was in a local engineering college and was thus familiar with names and details of some machinery. Of course the text retains a structure in language and content from which its 'recent nature' cannot be asserted. We must hasten to point out that this does not imply an oriental nature of the text at all. All that may be said is that thematically the drawings ought to be ruled out of discussion. And the text, as it stands, is incomplete and ambiguous by itself and incorrect at many places.

The authors expressed puzzlement at the contradiction and errors in the Vaimānika Śāstra text, especially since its compilers supposedly had access to publications that did not make such errors (such as Dayanand Saraswati's commentary on the Rigveda published in 1878 or earlier).

Controversy 

The 102nd Indian Science Congress held at the Mumbai University in January 2015 organised a session on "ancient sciences through Sanskrit" in which a presentation on Vaimānika Śāstra was included. It was delivered by Anand J. Bodas, a pilot, and Ameya Jadhav, who holds in an M.A. in Sanskrit as well as an M.Tech. degree. Bodas, speaking to the news media, has said that the aeroplanes of Vedic times could fly not only from country to country, but also "from planet to planet." "In those days, aeroplanes were huge in size, and could move left, right, as well as backwards, unlike modern planes which only fly forward," he added. Ram Prasad Gandhiraman, a NASA scientist, launched an on-line petition demanding that the talk be cancelled as it represents pseudoscience.

Vaimānika Shāstra and vimanas are also mentioned in works about pseudoscience such as Regal's Pseudoscience: A Critical Encyclopedia.  According to Regal, vimanas are one of the common attempts to fit elements of ancient cultures into contemporary narratives.  When put under scrutiny, the Vaimānika Shāstra "comes off as ".

In popular culture
 In 2010, 'Prapaatha', a Kannada language film made by K. Suchendra Prasad, has a story line where a young man tries to find out works of Subbaraya Shastry.
 In 2015 Hindi film Hawaizaada, Vaimānika Shāstra has been shown as the main theory book to build "India's first unmanned plane". The book was shown by Pandit Subbaraya Shastry (portrayed by Mithun Chakraborty), who originally wrote it.
 In 2016, 'Vyamanika' is a duo album recorded by Kit Downes on church organ and Tom Challenger  on saxophone in five Suffolk churches on the slipimprint recording label.

See also
Quimbaya artifacts
Chariots of the Gods?
Pranava-Vada of Gargyayana

Notes

References

External links
 Flights of fancy?,  ''The Week, 24 June 2001.
 Vimanika Shastra An incomplete version, containing the first six chapters, archived by Sacred Texts web site
  The Vimanika Shastra An incomplete version, containing the first six chapters, archived by scribd.com
 

Ancient astronaut speculation
Unidentified flying objects
1973 books
Channelled texts
Sanskrit texts